James Oscar Crump (March 14, 1898 – March 9, 1986) was an American Negro league second baseman in the 1920s.

A native of Jacksonville, Florida, Crump made his Negro leagues debut in 1921 with the Hilldale Club. He went on to play for the Brooklyn Royal Giants, and finished his career in 1923 with the Bacharach Giants. Crump died in Salem, Virginia in 1986 at age 87.

References

External links
 and Baseball-Reference Black Baseball stats and Seamheads

1898 births
1986 deaths
Bacharach Giants players
Brooklyn Royal Giants players
Hilldale Club players
Baseball second basemen
Baseball players from Jacksonville, Florida
20th-century African-American sportspeople